Midlands 3 East (North) is a level 8 English Rugby Union league and level 3 of the Midlands League, made up of teams from the northern part of the East Midlands region including clubs from Derbyshire, Lincolnshire, Nottinghamshire and the occasional team from Leicestershire, with home and away matches played throughout the season. When this division began in 1992 it was known as Midlands East 2, until it was split into two regional divisions called Midlands 4 East (North) and Midlands 4 East (South) ahead of the 2000–01 season. Further restructuring of the Midlands leagues ahead of the 2009–10 season, led to the current name of Midlands 3 East (North).

Promoted teams tend to move up to Midlands 2 East (North) while demoted teams typically drop to Midlands 4 East (North). Each year all clubs in the division also take part in the RFU Senior Vase - a level 8 national competition.

2021–22

Participating teams & locations

2020–21
Due to the COVID-19 pandemic, the 2020–21 season was cancelled.

2019–20

Participating teams & locations

2018–19

Participating teams & locations

2017–18

Participating teams & locations

Teams 2016-17
Ashby
Ashfield
Bakewell Mannerians (relegated from Midlands 2 East)
Belper 
Birstall (promoted from Midlands 4 East (North))
Buxton (promoted from Midlands 4 East (North))
Chesterfield Panthers
Grimsby
Lincoln
Mansfield (relegated from Midlands 2 East)
Rolls-Royce (promoted from Midlands 4 East (North))
Sleaford

Teams 2015-16
Ashby (relegated from Midlands 2 East (North))
Ashfield (promoted from Midlands 4 East (North))
Aylestone St James
Belper (promoted from Midlands 4 East (North))
Boston
Chesterfield Panthers
Grimsby
Kesteven
Lincoln
Loughborough (relegated from Midlands 2 East (North))
Nottingham Moderns
Sleaford

Teams 2014-15
Amber Valley (promoted from Midlands 4 East (North))
Aylestone St James	
Boston	
Chesterfield Panthers (promoted from Midlands 4 East (North))
Grimsby	
Kesteven (relegated from Midlands 2 East (North))
Lincoln
Mellish 
Melton Mowbray
Nottingham Moderns RFC
Sleaford	
Southwell

Teams 2013-14
Ashby	
Aylestone St James (relegated from Midlands 2 East (North))
Boston (promoted from Midlands 4 East (North))
East Retford
Grimsby
Lincoln
Mellish
Nottingham Moderns
Skegness (promoted from Midlands 4 East (North))
Sleaford (relegated from Midlands 2 East (North))
Southwell
West Bridgford

Teams 2012–13
Amber Valley
Ashby
Belper
East Retford (promoted from Midlands 4 East (North))
Grimsby
Kesteven
Lincoln
Melbourne
Mellish
Nottingham Moderns (relegated from Midlands 2 East (North))
Southwell (promoted from Midlands 4 East (North))
West Bridgford RFC (relegated from Midlands 2 East (North))

Teams 2011–12
Amber Valley
Ashby
Belper
Dronfield
Grimsby
Kesteven 
Lincoln
Melbourne
Mellish 
Nottingham Boots Corsairs
Sleaford
Worksop

Teams 2010–11
Amber Valley
Ashbourne 
Ashfield
Dronfield (promoted from Midlands 4 East (North))
Grimsby
Kesteven
Melbourne
Mellish
Nottingham Casuals
Sleaford
Southwell
Worksop

Teams 2008–09
Ashbourne
Bakewell Mannerians
Coalville
Grimsby 
Ilkeston
Lincoln
Loughborough
Melton Mowbray
Nottingham Moderns
Sleaford
Spalding
West Bridgford

Original teams

Teams in Midlands 3 East (North) and Midlands 3 East (South) were originally part of a single division called Midlands 2 East, which contained the following sides when it was introduced in 1992:

Coalville - promoted from East Midlands/Leicestershire (6th)
Glossop - promoted from Notts, Lincs & Derbyshire 1 (6th)
Kesteven - promoted from Notts, Lincs & Derbyshire 1 (9th)
Kettering - promoted from East Midlands/Leicestershire (7th)
Lincoln - promoted from Notts, Lincs & Derbyshire 1 (10th)
Long Buckby - promoted from East Midlands 1 (champions)
Lutterworth - promoted from East Midlands/Leicestershire (10th)
Market Rasen & Louth - promoted from Notts, Lincs & Derbyshire 2 (runners up)
Northampton BBOB - promoted from East Midlands/Leicestershire (9th)
South Leicester - promoted from Leicestershire 1 (champions)
Southwell - promoted from Notts, Lincs & Derbyshire 1 (7th)
Stamford - promoted from Notts, Lincs & Derbyshire 1 (8th)
Wellingborough - promoted from East Midlands/Leicestershire (8th)
Worksop - promoted from Notts, Lincs & Derbyshire 2 (champions)

Midlands 3 East (North) honours

Midlands East 2 (1992–1993)

Midlands 3 East (North) and Midlands 3 East (South) were originally part of a single tier 8 division called Midlands East 2. Promotion was to Midlands East 1 and relegation was to either East Midlands/Leicestershire 1 or Notts, Lincs & Derbyshire 1.

Midlands East 2 (1993–1996)

The top six teams from Midlands 1 and the top six from North 1 were combined to create National 5 North, meaning that Midlands 2 East dropped to become a tier 9 league. Promotion continued to Midlands East 1 while relegation was to either East Midlands/Leicestershire 1 or Notts, Lincs & Derbyshire 1.

Midlands East 2 (1996–2000)

At the end of the 1995–96 season National 5 North was discontinued and Midlands East 2 returned to being a tier 8 league. Promotion continued to Midlands East 1 while relegation was to either East Midlands/Leicestershire 1 or Notts, Lincs & Derbyshire 1.

Midlands 4 East (North) (2000–2006)

Restructuring ahead of the 2000–01 season saw Midlands East 2 split into two tier 8 regional leagues - Midlands 4 East (North) and Midlands 4 East (South). Promotion was now to Midlands 3 East (North) and relegation to either Notts, Lincs & Derbyshire/Leicestershire 1 East or Notts, Lincs & Derbyshire/Leicestershire 1 West.

Midlands 4 East (North) (2006–2009)

Midlands 4 East (North) continued to be a tier 8 league with promotion up into Midlands 3 East (North). However, the cancellation of Notts, Lincs & Derbyshire/Leicestershire 1 East and Notts, Lincs & Derbyshire/Leicestershire 1 West at the end of the 2005–06 season meant that relegation was now to the newly introduced Midlands 5 East (North).

Midlands 3 East (North) (2009–present)

League restructuring by the RFU meant that Midlands 4 East (North) and Midlands 4 East (South) were renamed as Midlands 3 East (North) and Midlands 3 East (South), with both leagues remaining at tier 8. Promotion was now to Midlands 2 East (North) (formerly Midlands 3 East (North)) and relegation to Midlands 4 East (North) (formerly Midlands 5 East (North)).

Number of league titles

Ashbourne (2)
Ashby (2)
Grimsby (2)
Oakham (2)
Bakewell Mannerians (1)
Dronfield (1)
Dunstablians (1)
Ilkeston (1)
Kesteven (1)
Kettering (1)
Lincoln (1)
Long Buckby (1)
Long Eaton (1)
Loughborough Students (1)
Lutterworth (1)
Luton (1)
Market Bosworth (1)
Market Rasen & Louth (1)
Matlock (1)
Melbourne (1)
Mellish (1)
Melton Mowbray (1)
Northampton Men's Own (1)
Nottingham Casuals (1)

Notes

See also
Midlands RFU
Leicestershire RU
Notts, Lincs & Derbyshire RFU
English rugby union system
Rugby union in England

References

8
4